Neofit (Неофит) is the Slavic form of the Greek name Neophytos, and may refer to:
 Neofit of Bulgaria (born 1945), Bulgarian Orthodox primate
 Neofit II (17781850), Romanian priest, head of the provisional government during the Wallachian Revolution of 1848
 Neofit Bozveli (1848), Bulgarian cleric and enlightener
 Neofit Rilski or Neophyte of Rila (17931881), Bulgarian monk, teacher and artist
  (18221910), Archbishop of Chișinău 189298

Places
Neofit Peak, mountain in Antarctica named after Neofit Rilski

See also
South-West University "Neofit Rilski", university in Blagoevgrad, Bulgaria
Neophyte (disambiguation)
Neophytus (disambiguation)